The 1875 East Aberdeenshire by-election was fought on 22 December 1875.  The byelection was fought due to the death of the incumbent Liberal MP, William Dingwall Fordyce.  It was won by the Conservative Party (UK) candidate Alexander Hamilton-Gordon.

References

Politics of Aberdeenshire
1875 elections in the United Kingdom
1875 in Scotland
1870s elections in Scotland
December 1875 events
19th century in Aberdeenshire
Aberdeenshire, East